"Flower" is the thirty-fourth single by Japanese recording artist Gackt, released on July 1, 2009. This single is the final of the four singles of the countdown to Gackt's 10th anniversary as solo artist. Each of the countdown singles were released within a week of each other. There are two versions of the music video.

CD

Charts

References

2009 singles
Gackt songs
Songs written by Gackt
2009 songs